Channel 33 (Arutz Shloshim VeShalosh) was an Israeli Arabic-language free-to-air television channel, operated by the Israel Broadcasting Authority (IBA), which was primarily designated for Arabic-speaking viewers.

History

Establishment – 1994
The channel was launched in 1994 as a result of the Israeli-Palestinian peace-process. The Israeli prime-minister Itzhak Rabin decided to establish a government-operated satellite channel in Arabic, which was intended for viewers in neighbouring Arab countries. Soon after the establishment, the channel began to relay broadcasts from the Knesset, the Israeli parliament.

Reviving the channel – 1998
In early 1998, in light of the low viewers-rating, the channel had assigned a new brand, in hope that it will attract more viewers. The new brand was "Channel 33" with the slogan "Channel 33 - Much more interesting!".

The name "Channel 33" was chosen since the channel is relayed at station no. 33 in the Israeli cable systems.

Arabic-language broadcasts era – 2002
In 2002, the IBA established a third TV channel – IBA Arabic Channel – which was intended for Arabic-speaking viewers in foreign countries (this was the original purpose that Channel 33 was established for) and for Arabic-speaking Israelis. For the latter purpose, the "Israel Television in Arabic" department of the IBA, which until then broadcast on IBA Channel 1 2–4 hours a day, had moved to the new channel, where Channel 1 was left only with Hebrew programming. Some years earlier, in 1985, Israel Television in Arabic had been awarded the prestigious Israel Prize, for its special contribution to society and the State. IBA Arabic Channel was broadcasting via the European Hot Bird satellite.

Due to lack in Arabic programs, the channel also broadcast reruns from IBA's Channel 1 and Channel 33. In a couple of years after the establishment, IBA had realised that it cannot financially support three TV channels, and decided to merge Channel 33 with the Arabic channel into a new IBA "Channel 3 - Middle East" in early 2004.

As a result, Channel 33 replaced IBA Arabic Channel on the European satellite in April 2004, and began an all-Europe coverage. Additionally, Channel 33 began a terrestrial transmission throughout Israel, in order to relay Arabic programming to Arabic-speaking Israelis.

Knesset transmission concession loss – 2004
Due to the merge of IBA's Arabic channel and Channel 33, there was little air-time left in the unified channel to relay to Knesset sessions. Because of that, and an initiative to establish a parliament channel (like C-SPAN in the United States) the Knesset passed a new law – "TV Transmission from the Knesset" in 2004 which led to the establishment of the "Knesset Channel", following a public tender in which the IBA had lost the concession to "The Second news company". Starting on 3 May 2004, the Knesset broadcasts are relayed in Knesset Channel.

Today
The channel is dedicated primarily to Arab-speaking viewers, but due to financial reasons, the IBA had to cut the all-European coverage of Channel 33 through the European Hot Bird satellite, a move that affected many viewers of the channel.
As of today, the channel is relayed terrestrially in Israel, and by the Israeli AMOS satellite on its Middle-East beam. In 2010, The Israel Broadcasting Authority (IBA) English television news director Steve Leibowitz came out against a proposal by Knesset Economics Committee head Ophir Akunis on Monday to close down Channel 33 as a cost-cutting move. Although it could've saved as much as NIS 60 million, opposition claimed it would reduce broadcast time.

There are plans to turn Channel 33 in a news and information station broadcasting in Hebrew, Arabic and English along the lines of Reshet Bet, the popular public radio station. In 2013, IBA Channel 33 was expected to resume all-European coverage through the Hot Bird satellite.

Closure
The Israel Broadcasting Authority (IBA) was closed on 14 May 2017, and so was Channel 33. IBA was replaced by IPBC (Israeli Public Broadcasting Corporation), therefore Makan has replaced IBA Channel 33.

Notes

External links

Arabic-language television stations
Defunct television channels in Israel
Television channels and stations established in 1994
Television channels and stations disestablished in 2017
1994 establishments in Israel
Israel Broadcasting Authority
Arabic-language mass media in Israel
2017 disestablishments in Israel